The Ukrainian Soviet Army was a field army of the Red Army during the Russian Civil War, which existed between November 30, 1918 and June 1, 1919. It was officially the Army of the second formation of the Ukrainian Soviet Socialist Republic. The commander-in-chief was Vladimir Antonov-Ovseyenko and the Army counted 188,000 soldiers in May 1919. It operated from January 4, 1919 on the territory of Ukraine as part of the Ukrainian Front.

The Army was disbanded on June 1, 1919 and its formations came under command of Moscow, when the initial positive mood of the Ukrainian peasant soldiers had changed dramatically under the influence of the policy of War communism. This had led to rebellions in parts of the Ukrainian Red Army at the end of April - early May 1919, of which the most serious was that of the 6th Ukrainian Soviet Division, called the Hryhoriv Uprising.

Commanders

Commander 
 Vladimir Antonov-Ovseyenko

Members of the Revolutionary Military Council 
 Volodymyr Zatonsky
 Fyodor Sergeyev

Chief of Staff 
 Voldemar Aussem

Sources 
 The Civil War in Ukraine 1918-1920. Collection of documents and materials in three volumes, four books. Kiev, 1967.
 V. Antonov-Ovseyenko. Notes on the Civil War.

Armies of Ukraine
Soviet field armies in the Russian Civil War
Military units and formations established in 1918
Military units and formations disestablished in 1919